Yastrzemski , Yastrzemsky, Yastrzhembsky, etc., are surnames, transliterations of the Polish surname Jastrzębski. Notable people with the surname include:

Carl Yastrzemski (born 1939), American baseball player
Mike Yastrzemski (born 1990), American baseball player, and grandson of Carl
 Sergey Yastrzhembsky (born 1953), Russian politician